BGR may refer to:

Organizations
 BGR Capital & Trade, a US investment bank
 BGR Group, the US lobbying firm co-founded by Haley Barbour
 Boy Genius Report, a technology weblog
  (Institute for Geosciences and Natural Resources), a Federal Institute of the Federal Republic of Germany

Places
 Bangor International Airport, a joint civil-military public airport west of the city of Bangor, Penobscot County, Maine, United States by IATA airport code
 Bulgaria, by ISO 3166-1 alpha-3 country code

Science and technology
 BGR (subpixels), blue, green, red, an RGB display pixel layout
 Boy Genius Report, a weblog that specializes in technology and consumer gadgets
 Bulletin of Glaciological Research, a peer-reviewed scientific journal

Other uses 
 Bob Graham Round, a 24-hour fell-running challenge in the Lake District, England

See also
 GBR (disambiguation)
 RGB (disambiguation)